Know Thy Child is a 1921 Australian silent film directed by Franklyn Barrett.

It is considered a lost film.

Plot
A travelling salesman, Ray Standford (Roland Conway), seduces country girl Sadie McClure (Vera James) but forgets about her when she returns to the city and marries Dorothy Graham (Nada Conrade), daughter of his boss. Sadie gives birth to a daughter, Eileen (Lotus Thompson), who becomes Ray's personal secretary. Dorothy becomes a social worker and she and Ray can not have children. Dorothy pressures the government to declare bigamous all marriages contracted by people who were "morally pledged" to others. Ray becomes attracted to Ellen, but she has a sweetheart, engineer Geoffrey Dexter.  One night burglars enter a building containing Ray, Eileen and Geoffrey but they fight them off.

Sadie dies and Standford and Dorothy adopt the girl.

Cast
Roland Conway as Ray Standford
Nada Conrade as Dorothy Graham
Lotus Thompson as Eileen Baker
Vera James as Sadie McClure
Gerald Harcourt as Geoffrey Dexter
Lily Rochefort

Production
The film was shot in Sydney at the Rushcutters Bay Studio with exteriors done at Berowra Waters and at Grenwell Point near Nowra.

A contemporary report said it featured "probably the biggest set ever used in an Australian film." Filming was completed by July 1921.

This was the film debut of Lotus Thompson who later achieved fame in Hollywood.

Actress Wendy Osborne later claimed she refused a role in the film on moral grounds.

Release
Barrett distributed the movie himself, but it was not a big success at the box office.

The film was seen by Sir Walter Davidson, the Governor of New South Wales, whose endorsement of the film was used prominently in advertising.

See also
List of lost films

References

External links

Know Thy Child at National Film and Sound Archive
Know Thy Child at SilentEra

1921 films
Australian drama films
Australian black-and-white films
Australian silent feature films
Lost Australian films
1921 drama films
1921 lost films
Lost drama films
Silent drama films